Grand Ouest Association Lyonnaise Football Club (short: GOAL FC, or Goal FC) is a French association football club founded in 2000. It took its current name in 2020 when Monts d'Or Azergues Foot merged with smaller amateur clubs Tassin FC, Champagne Sport FC and Futsal Saône Monts d'Or. They are based in the towns of Chasselay, Anse, Tassin-la-Demi-Lune, and Champagne-au-Mont-d'Or in the Auvergne-Rhône-Alpes region, and their main home stadium is the Stade Ludovic Giuly in Chasselay, named after France international Ludovic Giuly. Since the 2016–17 season, they play in the Championnat National 2.

On 4 January 2014, the team beat Istres of Ligue 2 in a penalty shootout in the last 32 of the Coupe de France.

Current squad

References

External links
  

Association football clubs established in 2000
2000 establishments in France
Chasselay, Rhône
Sport in Rhône (department)
Football clubs in Auvergne-Rhône-Alpes